Antwan McClellan is an American Republican Party politician who has represented the 1st Legislative District in the New Jersey General Assembly since January 14, 2020. McClellan served as an Ocean City Councilman from 2012 until 2020.

Personal and early life 
McClellan is a lifelong resident of Ocean City. He is the youngest of six siblings. He attended Ocean City High School as well as Virginia State University and Old Dominion University. McClellan serves as the Confidential Assistant/Personnel Director/Public Information Officer in the Cape May County Sheriff's Department. He was first elected to the Ocean City Council in 2012 and was re-elected in 2016. He has also served as a member of the Ocean City Board of Education, a trustee on the Ocean City Historical Museum and a volunteer for the South Jersey Field of Dreams.

New Jersey Assembly
McClellan started his bid for Assembly in early 2019. He ran as a team alongside Mike Testa and Erik Simonsen. McClellan alongside Simonsen ousted incumbents Bruce Land and Matt Milam. He was also the first African American Republican in the legislature since 2002.

Republicans attacked the Democratic-supporting General Majority PAC for darkening McClellan's face in a mailer, accusing them of racism and demanding the mailer be withdrawn. McClellan commented on the mailer, "The Democratic Party claims to be the party of inclusion. However, the moment a person of color like me disagrees with their narrative, they launch an ad hominem attack, whip out their best 'Aunt Jemima' photograph, and purposefully darken my complexion in order to suppress dissent."

Tenure 
McClellan was sworn into the Assembly on January 14, 2020, when the 219th New Jersey Legislature convened.

Committee assignments 
Appropriations
Homeland Security and State Preparedness
Tourism Gaming and the Arts

District 1

New Jersey's 1st Legislative District encompasses parts of Atlantic County, New Jersey, Cumberland County, New Jersey, and all of Cape May County, New Jersey. Each of the 40 districts in the New Jersey Legislature has one representative in the New Jersey Senate and two members in the New Jersey General Assembly. The representatives from the 2nd District for the 2022—2023 Legislative Session are:
Senator Mike Testa (R)
Assemblyman Erik Simonsen (R)
Assemblyman Antwan McClellan (R)

Electoral history

General Assembly

References

External links
Legislative Webpage

African-American state legislators in New Jersey
People from Ocean City, New Jersey
Year of birth missing (living people)
Living people
Virginia State University alumni
Old Dominion University alumni
Republican Party members of the New Jersey General Assembly
21st-century American politicians
21st-century African-American politicians